Dayanita Singh (born 18 March 1961) is an Indian photographer whose primary format is the book. She has published fourteen books.

Singh's art reflects and expands on the ways in which people relate to photographic images. Her later works, drawn from her extensive photographic oeuvre, are a series of mobile museums allowing her images to be endlessly edited, sequenced, archived and displayed. Stemming from her interest in the archive, the museums present her photographs as interconnected bodies of work that are full of both poetic and narrative possibilities.

Publishing is also a significant part of Singh's practice. She has created multiple "book-objects" – works that are concurrently books, art objects, exhibitions, and catalogues – often with the publisher Steidl. Museum Bhavan has been shown at the Hayward Gallery, London (2013), the Museum für Moderne Kunst, Frankfurt (2014), the Art Institute of Chicago, Chicago (2014) and the Kiran Nadar Museum of Art, New Delhi (2016).

Early life and background
Singh was born in New Delhi on 18 March 1961. She was the oldest of four sisters.

Singh studied Visual Communication at the National Institute of Design in Ahmedabad and later Documentary Photography at the International Center of Photography in New York City. She started her career in photojournalism and retired in the late 1990s.

Career
Singh's first foray into photography and bookmaking came through a chance encounter with tabla player Zakir Hussain, when he invited her to photograph him in rehearsal after she was shoved by an aggressive official while attempting to shoot him in concert. For the six winters following, Singh documented several Hussain tours and, in 1986, finally published the images in her first book, Zakir Hussain. Referring to him as her first "true guru", Singh believes that Hussain taught her the most important of all skills: focus.
  

Singh's second book, Myself Mona Ahmed was published in 2001, after more than a decade spent on assignment as a photojournalist. A mix of photobook, biography, autobiography and fiction, this 'visual novel' emerged as a result of her refusal to be the subject of what could have been a routine but problematic photojournalistic project as well as her discomfort with the West's tendency to view India through simplistic, exotic lenses.

In the years following, publishing has been a significant part of Singh's career. She has created multiple "book-objects" – works that are concurrently books, art objects, exhibitions, and catalogues—often in collaboration with the publisher Gerhard Steidl in Göttingen, Germany. These include Privacy, Chairs, the direction-changing Go Away Closer, the seven-volume Sent a Letter, Blue Book, Dream Villa, Fileroom and Museum of Chance. Sent a Letter was included in the 2011 Phaidon Press book Defining Contemporary Art: 25 years in 200 Pivotal Artworks. Steidl said in a 2013 interview on Deutsche Welle television, "She is the genius of book making". Dream Villa was produced during her Robert Gardner Fellowship in Photography given annually by the Peabody Museum of Archaeology and Ethnology at Harvard University; Singh was its second recipient in 2008.

The "book-object" medium has allowed Singh to explore her interest in the poetic and narrative possibility of sequence and re-sequence, allowing her to create photographic patterns while simultaneously disrupting them. Her books rarely include text; instead she lets the photographs speak for themselves. These ideas are furthered through her experimentation with alternate ways of producing and viewing photographs to explore how people relate to photographic images.

Singh has created and displayed a series of mobile museums, giving her the space to constantly sequence, edit, and archive her images. These mobile museums stemmed in large part from Singh's interest in archives and the archival process. Her mobile museums are displayed in large wooden architectural structures that can be rearranged and opened or closed in various ways. Each holds 70 to 140 photographs that Singh rearranges for each show so that only a portion of the photos or parts of each images are visible at any given time, capitalizing on the interconnected and fluid capacity of her work while allowing ample opportunity for evolving narratives and interpretations.

Museum Bhavan has been shown at the Hayward Gallery, London (2013), the Museum für Moderne Kunst, Frankfurt (2014), the Art Institute of Chicago, Chicago (2014) and the Kiran Nadar Museum of Art, New Delhi (2016).

Singh's works have also been presented at the German pavilion in the Venice Biennale. In 2009, the Fundación MAPFRE in Madrid organised a retrospective of her work, which subsequently travelled to Amsterdam, Bogota and Umea. Her pictures of "File Rooms" were first presented in the exhibition, Illuminazione, at the 2011 Venice Biennale.

In 2014, at the National Museum, New Delhi, Singh built the Book Museum using her publications File Room and Privacy as well as her mother's book, Nony Singh: The Archivist. And she also displayed a part of Kitchen Museum which are accordion-fold books with silver gelatin prints in 8 teak vitrines that she makes as letters to fellow travellers or conservationists since 2000. Seven of these were published by Steidl as "Sent a Letter".

Singh also presented the Museum of Chance as a book-object for the first time in India in November 2014 at a show in the Goethe-Institut in Mumbai and in January 2015 at a show in the Goethe-Institut / Max Mueller Bhavan in New Delhi. The book-object is a work that is a book, an art object, an exhibition and a catalogue, all at once. In order to move away from showing editioned prints framed on the wall, Singh made the book itself the art object: a work to be valued, looked at and read as such, rather than being regarded as a gathering of photographic reproductions.

In 2018, Singh released Museum Bhavan as a book. It is an "exhibition" in the form of a book, with "galleries" held in a small box containing nine thin accordion books that expand to a 7.5-foot-long gallery of black and white photos drawn from Singh's archive. In 2017 Museum Bhavan won PhotoBook of the Year in the Paris Photo–Aperture Foundation PhotoBook Awards and in 2018 was awarded the Infinity Award of the International Center of Photography.

Dayanita Singh served as a Jury Member for the Serendipity Arles Grant 2020.

Publications

Book objects

 Box 507, Spontaneous, New Delhi.
 Box of Shedding, Spontaneous, New Delhi.
 BV Box, Spontaneous, New Delhi.
 Pothi Box, Spontaneous, New Delhi.
 Kochi Box, Spontaneous, New Delhi.
 Museum of Chance Book Object.
 File Room Book Object

Books by Singh
 Zakir Hussain, Himalaya, 1986.
 Myself Mona Ahmed, Scalo, 2001. 
 Privacy, Steidl, 2004. 
 Chairs, Isabella Stewart Gardner Museum and Steidl, 2005.
 Go Away Closer, Steidl, 2006. 
 Sent a Letter, Steidl, 2008. 
 Blue Book, Steidl, 2009. ISBN 978-3-86521-839-1
 Dream Villa, Steidl, 2010. 
 House of Love, Radius & Peabody Museum 2011. 
 File Room, Steidl, 2013. 
 Museum of Chance, Steidl, 2015. 
 Museum Bhavan, Steidl, 2017. 
 Zakir Hussain Maquette, Steidl, 2019.

Exhibitions

Solo exhibitions

 2000 I am as I am, Ikon Gallery, Birmingham
 2003 Dayanita Singh: Image/Text (Photographs 1989–2002), Department of Art and Aesthetics. Jawaharlal Nehru University, New Delhi
 2003 Myself Mona Ahmed, Museum of Asian Art, Berlin
 2003 Dayanita Singh: Privacy, Nationalgalerie im Hamburger Bahnhof, Berlin
 2004 Privacy, Rencontres-Arles, Arles
 2005 Chairs, Isabella Stewart Gardner museum, Boston
 2007 Go Away Closer, Kriti gallery, Varanasi
 2008 Sent a Letter, National Gallery of Modern Art, Mumbai    
 2008 Les Rencontres d'Arles festival, France
 2010 Dayanita Singh (Photographs 1989 – 2010), Huis Marseille, Amsterdam, Netherlands
 2010 Dayanita Singh, Mapfre Foundation, Madrid
 2011 Dayanita Singh, Museum of Art, Bogota
 2011 House of Love, Peabody Museum, Harvard University, Cambridge 
 2012 Monuments of Knowledge, Photographs by Dayanita Singh, King's College London
 2012 Dayanita Singh / The Adventures of a Photographer, Bildmuseet, Umea University, Sweden
 2013 Go Away Closer, Hayward Gallery, London
 2014 Building the Book Museum: photography, language, form National Museum, New Delhi
 2014 Go Away Closer, MMK Museum für Moderne Kunst Frankfurt am Main, Frankfurt      
 2014 Dayanita Singh, Art Institute, Chicago
 2014 Museum of Chance: A Book Story, Goethe-Institut, Mumbai
 2015 Dayanita Singh: Book works, Goethe-Institut / Max Mueller Bhavan, New Delhi
 2015–2016 Conversation Chambers Museum Bhavan, Kiran Nadar Museum of Art, New Delhi
 2016 Museum of Chance Book Object, Hawa Mahal, Jaipur
2016 Museum of Chance Book Object, Dhaka Art Summit, Bangladesh
2017 Dayanita Singh: Museum Bhavan,Tokyo Photographic Art Museum, Tokyo
2022 Dayanita Singh: Dancing with my Camera, Gropius Bau, Berlin

Group exhibitions

 1995 So many worlds—Photographs from DU Magazine, Holderbank, Aargau, Switzerland
 2000 Century City, Tate Modern, London
 2002 Photo Sphere, Nature Morte, New Delhi
 2005 Edge of Desire, Asia Society, New York
 2005 Presence, Sepia International, New York
 2006 Cities in Transition, NYC, Boston Hartford
 2013 Biennale di Venezia, German Pavilion
 2016 Biennale of Sydney, Museum of Contemporary Art, Sydney, Australia
2016 Dhaka Art Summit, Bangladesh
2017 Tate Modern, London.
2018 Fearless: Contemporary South Asian Art, Art Gallery New South Wales, Sydney
2018 57th Carnegie International, Carnegie Museum of Art, Pittsburgh
2019 Surrounds: 11 Installations, The Museum of Modern Art, New York
2020 Off the Wall, San Francisco Museum of Modern Art, San Francisco

Honors and awards
 2008 Robert Gardner Fellowship, Harvard University
 2008 Prince Claus Award, Government of The Netherlands
2014 Chevalier dans l'Ordre des Arts et des Lettres
2017 Paris Photo-Aperture Foundation PhotoBook Awards, PhotoBook of the Year: Museum Bhavan
2018 International Center of Photography Infinity Award, Artist's Book: Museum Bhavan
2022: Hasselblad Award, Hasselblad Foundation, Gothenburg, Sweden. An award of 2 million Swedish krona, or about US$206,500.

Collections
Singh's work is held in the following permanent collections:

 Allen Memorial Art Museum, Oberlin, Ohio
 Art Gallery of New South Wales, Sydney
 Art Institute of Chicago, Chicago
 Asian Art Museum, San Francisco
 Centre Pompidou, Paris
 National Centre for Visual Arts, CNAP, France
 Fondazione MAST, Bologna
 Fotomuseum Winterthur, Winterthur
 Fundacion Mapfre, Madrid
 Herbert F Johnson Museum of Art, Cornell University
 Huis Marseille, Museum for Photography, Amsterdam
 Kunsthaus Zurich, Switzerland
 Louisiana Museum of Modern Art, Humlebaek
 Isabella Stewart Gardener Museum, Boston
 Ishara Art Foundation, Dubai
 Mead Art Gallery, University of Warwick
 Arthur M. Sackler Museum, Harvard University, Cambridge, Massachusetts
 Metropolitan Museum of Art, New York
 Moderna Museet, Stockholm 
Museum für Moderne Kunst, Frankfurt
 Museum of Fine Arts, Houston, Texas
 Museum of Modern Art, New York
 National Gallery of Australia, Canberra
 National Gallery of Canada, Ottawa
 National Gallery of Modern Art, New Delhi
 Nelson-Atkins Museum of Art, Kansas City, Missouri
 The New Art Gallery Walsall, Walsall 
 University of Chicago Booth School of Business, Chicago
 Tokyo Photographic Art Museum
 Southampton City Art Gallery, Southampton
 Tate Modern, London

References

External links

Through the cracks of a mirror Published in ShahidulNews, 6 December 2008
What Goes on in the Minds of India's Most Famous Photographers?

Video
Stealing in the night. An interview with Dayanita Singh Video by Louisiana Channel
Dayanita Singh – Slide Lecture: Chandigarh Lalit Kala Akademi
Dayanita Singh
The Wall TV: Video 2 – Signing her love – Dayanita Singh 
Navina Sundram-Dayanita Singh Lectures:Chandigarh ... 
Dayanita Singh al Padiglione Germania (Francia) Biennale 2013 
Dayanita Singh Delhi Photo Festival

Indian photojournalists
1961 births
Living people
People from New Delhi
Indian portrait photographers
National Institute of Design alumni
Social documentary photographers
Indian women journalists
Indian women photographers
20th-century Indian journalists
Journalists from Delhi
20th-century Indian women artists
21st-century Indian photographers
21st-century Indian women artists
21st-century Indian journalists
20th-century Indian women writers
21st-century Indian women writers
Women writers from Delhi
Women artists from Delhi
Photographers from Delhi
20th-century women photographers
21st-century women photographers
Designers at National Institute of Design
Women photojournalists